Ömer Lütfi or Ömer Lütfü may refer to:

Ömer Lütfi Yasan (1878–1956), Ottoman military officer and Turkish politician
Ömer Lütfi Argeşo (1879–1942), Ottoman military officer and Turkish politician
Ömer Lütfi Akad (1916–2011), Turkish film director
Ömer Lütfü Topal (1942–1996), Turkish businessman involved in the Susurluk scandal